Nyctemera kiauensis is a moth of the family Erebidae first described by Jeremy Daniel Holloway in 1976. It is found on Borneo.

References

Nyctemerina
Moths described in 1976